Alucita butleri is a species of moth of the family Alucitidae. It is known from South Africa.

References

Endemic moths of South Africa
Alucitidae
Moths of Africa
Moths described in 1875
Taxa named by Hans Daniel Johan Wallengren